Maurice Franklin Weisner (November 20, 1917October 15, 2006) was a four-star admiral of the United States Navy who served as Vice Chief of Naval Operations (VCNO) from 1972 to 1973; commander in  chief, U.S. Pacific Fleet (CINCPACFLT) from 1973 to 1976; and commander in chief of the U.S. Pacific Command (CINCPAC) from 1976 to 1979. 

He then graduated from flight school, becoming a Naval Aviator in 1943 and returning to combat in the Southwest Pacific until June 1945. He was credited with the sinking of a Japanese destroyer escort during that tour.

He retired in November 1979. In retirement, Weisner presided as president of the Naval Aviation Museum Foundation until 1993

Awards and decorations
Weisner's awards and decorations include:

 

Foreign decorations from Japan, the Republic of Korea, Republic of Vietnam, Philippine Republic, Kingdom of Thailand and the United Nations.
As the senior active duty naval aviator, he received the Gray Eagle Award.

Retirement
Weisner retired from the Navy in 1979. He died in 2006 and was buried in Barrancas National Cemetery

See also

He was preceded in death by his son who is listed a MIA in Vietnam During 1969.  I know this to be fact since my brother was in the same plane that went down.  So they are part of the names listed on the Vietnam Memorial on the same day during that conflict. 

The name can be seen on the Wall Website.

References

CNO Statement on Passing of Retired Adm. Maurice F. Weisner

United States Navy personnel of World War II
Recipients of the Legion of Merit
Recipients of the Distinguished Flying Cross (United States)
United States Navy admirals
1917 births
2006 deaths
Recipients of the Air Medal
Recipients of the Distinguished Service Medal (US Army)
Vice Chiefs of Naval Operations
Recipients of the Defense Distinguished Service Medal
Recipients of the Navy Distinguished Service Medal
Recipients of the Air Force Distinguished Service Medal
Burials at Barrancas National Cemetery